Herman Albert "Ace" Lawson (December 24, 1916 – May 9, 1995) was a former Sacramento, California city councilman, Fresno State University football standout, highly decorated U.S. Army Air Force/U.S. Air Force officer, combat fighter pilot, and combat flight instructor with the 332nd Fighter Group's 99th Pursuit Squadron, best known as the Tuskegee Airmen or "Red Tails". He was one of 1,007 documented Tuskegee Airmen Pilots.

During World War II, Lawson earned the Silver Star, the Distinguished Service Cross, and the Distinguished Flying Cross for aerial action on October 4, 1944.

Early life
Lawson was born on December 24, 1916, in Fowler, California, Fresno County He was the son of Herman Lawson (1885–1935), an Oklahoma native, and Frances Anne Walker Lawson (June 30, 1881 - April 24, 1961).

Lawson attended Marysville High School, where he garnered the nickname "Ace" as its star football player.

In the late 1930s after a year in the Civilian Conservation Corp, Lawson attended Fresno State University, one of three African American students there at the time. While at Fresno, Lawson became the first African American to play four years of football there. He also served as the Fresno Football team's official photographer. A prolific athlete, Lawson was also Fresno's collegiate Light Heavyweight Boxing champion, a letterman in Basketball, and a letterman in track and field.

At Fresno, Lawson met and later married fellow student Pearl Lee Johnson Lawson, an aspiring teacher. The Lawsons had seven children: Betty Lawson Davis, Patricia Lawson, Gloria Lawson-Riddle, Yvonne Lawson, Thomas Lawson, Tracey Lawson, and a child who died as an infant.

After riding on an aircraft with a pilot friend, Lawson became interested in becoming a pilot and joining the U.S. Army Air Corps. Lawson became one of the first African Americans in Northern California to earn a Private Pilot license. He also built his own functioning gliders.

Military service

While a student at Fresno State University, Lawson and a group of friends attended an interview event with the U.S. Army Air Corps. After an hour's wait, an U.S. Army Air Corps Colonel and a Lieutenant dismissed Lawson, telling him that the military had no interest in recruiting "night fighters," a vague but albeit stark reference to Lawson's race.  Undeterred, Lawson wrote a letter to Congress and a separate letter to President Franklin D. Roosevelt's wife, First Lady Eleanor Roosevelt who had been sympathetic to African American causes. After receiving an U.S. Army Air Corps flight school acceptance letter in the U.S. mails, Lawson rushed to a local train station en route to Tuskegee Army Air Field in Tuskegee, Alabama, abandoning his car storing $1,000 worth of camera equipment in its trunk.

Lawson became one of second group of 99th Fighter Squadron replacement pilots. Lawson and several other 99th Fighter Squadron pilots were sent to Brazil in error.

During World War II, Lawson earned the Silver Star, the Distinguished Service Cross, and the Distinguished Flying Cross for aerial action on October 4, 1944. Using P-40s, P-47s, and P-51s, Lawson flew 133 missions in World War II's European Theater including Greece, Bulgaria, Germany, Austria, France, Poland, Yugoslavia, and Czechoslovakia. He  survived two engine failures in P-40s; one of his P-40s landed him in the Mediterranean. Lawson later flew another P-40 named "Ace of Pearls", and another P-51B named "Ace of Pearls", both named in honor of Lawson's wife Pearl.  
 
On September 22, 1944, as the 99th Fighter Squadron's flight leader, Lawson and his squadron escorted 5th Bomb Wing B-17 bombers on a mission to destroy an Allach BMW Engine Works plant in Munich, Germany. One of Lawson's squadron pilots, Flight Officer Leonard R. Willette, radioed that he needed to bail from his aircraft as a result of low oil pressure. Though Lawson instructed Willette to change radio channels and head back to base, Willette, unable to bail, crashed. The Germans recovered Willette's body, returning it through the Red Cross.

After his tour in Europe ended, Lawson returned to Tuskegee as a flight instructor. After World War II, Lawson remained in the military, retiring after 25 years with the rank of Major.

Awards
Congressional Gold Medal (2007)
Distinguished Service Cross
Silver Star

Post-Military, Politics
After leaving the military, Lawson worked 20 years for the State of California. In 1973, Lawson was appointed to the Sacramento, California City Council as District 2 Councilman, completing the remainder of then-recently deceased District 2 council member Rosenwald Robertson's term until 1975. District 2, located in the northeastern area of Sacramento, included the neighborhoods of Arden Fair, Ben Ali, Cannon Industrial Park, Del Paso Heights, Erikson Industrial Park, Glenwood Meadows, Hagginwood, Noralto, North Sacramento, Parker Homes, Robla, Strawberry Manor, Swanston Estates, Woodlake, Youngs Heights.

Death
Lawson died on May 9, 1995, in Sacramento, California. He was 78. Lawson was interred at the Sunset Lawn Chapel of the Chimes Memorial Park in Sacramento, California.

See also
Tuskegee Airmen
List of Tuskegee Airmen Cadet Pilot Graduation Classes
List of Tuskegee Airmen
Military history of African Americans
 Dogfights (TV series)
 Executive Order 9981
 The Tuskegee Airmen (movie)

References

Notes

External links
 Fly (2009 play about the 332d Fighter Group)
Herman A. Lawson Black Eagles
Tuskegee Airmen at Tuskegee University
 Tuskegee Airmen Archives at the University of California, Riverside Libraries.
 Tuskegee Airmen, Inc.
 Tuskegee Airmen National Historic Site (U.S. National Park Service) 
 Tuskegee Airmen National Museum

Tuskegee Airmen
1916 births
1995 deaths
African-American aviators
People from California
Aviators from California
United States Army Air Forces pilots of World War II
Military personnel from Sacramento, California